Eriogonum pyrolifolium (Shasta buckwheat, pyrola-leafed buckwheat, alpine buckwheat, alpine eriogonum, oarleaf buckwheat, or dirty socks) is a species of wild buckwheat. It is native to western North America, from British Columbia to the high mountains of California.

Description
This is a small woody perennial reaching a maximum height and width of about 20 centimeters, including its inflorescence. Its rounded or spade-shaped, woolly (sometimes glabrous), petioled leaves are located at the base of the plant; their resemblance to the leaves of wintergreens (genus Pyrola) gives the species its name. The wool on the leaves and petioles sometimes has a pronounced orange color. Clusters of flowers appear on stalks which may be erect or bend to the ground. The small hairy flowers are greenish-white or white to pink.  At certain times during growth and blossoming this plant will emit an odor similar to sweaty, unwashed socks.

Habitat
Eriogonum pyrolifolium often grows on nearly barren dry rocky soil in sub-alpine and alpine locations, including extensive pumice and tephra slopes on Mount Rainier and other Cascade range volcanoes.

Gallery

References

External links

 CalFlora Database: Eriogonum pyrolifolium (Shasta buckwheat)
Jepson eFlora (TJM2) treatment for Eriogonum pyrolifolium
UC CalPhotos gallery for Eriogonum pyrolifolium

pyrolifolium
Flora of California
Flora of British Columbia
Flora of the Northwestern United States
Flora of the Cascade Range
Alpine flora
Taxa named by William Jackson Hooker
Flora without expected TNC conservation status